Ridley is a civil parish in Cheshire East, England. It contains two buildings that are recorded in the National Heritage List for England as designated listed buildings.  Of these, one is listed at Grade II*, the middle grade, and the other is at Grade II.  The parish is almost entirely rural, its listed buildings consisting of the gatehouse of a former country house, and a school.

Key

Buildings

References

Citations

Sources

 

Listed buildings in the Borough of Cheshire East
Lists of listed buildings in Cheshire